News World Communications Inc. is an American international news media corporation.

Background
It was founded in New York City, in 1976, by Unification movement founder and leader Sun Myung Moon. Its first two newspapers, The News World (later renamed the New York City Tribune) and the Spanish-language Noticias del Mundo, were published in New York from 1976 until the early 1990s. In October 2009, Hyun Jin Moon took over as chairman. 

News World Communications currently owns United Press International, GolfStyles (formerly Washington Golf Monthly), Segye Ilbo (South Korea), and Sekai Nippo (Japan). Formerly, it owned The World and I, as well as the now defunct Tiempos del Mundo, Zambezi Times (South Africa) and Middle East Times (Egypt). 

Until 2008, it published the Washington D.C.-based newsmagazine Insight on the News. News World Communications' best-known newspaper was The Washington Times, which the company owned from the paper's founding in 1982 until 2010, when Sun Myung Moon and a group of former Times editors purchased the paper from News World Communications under the company News World Media Development, which now also owns The World and I. The Times is currently owned by diversified conglomerate owned by the Unification movement, Operations Holdings, through The Washington Times LLC.

References

External links
Who Owns What: News World Communications, Inc., Columbia Journalism Review
The World and I
GolfStyles online
Tiempos Del Mundo 
Segye Ilbo 
Sekai Nippo 

Newspaper companies of the United States
Conservative magazines published in the United States
Unification Church affiliated organizations
Unification Church political involvement
Mass media companies established in 1976